Sheffield DocFest (formerly styled Sheffield Doc/Fest), short for Sheffield International Documentary Festival (SIDF), is an international documentary festival and Marketplace held annually in Sheffield, England.

The Festival includes film screenings, interactive and virtual reality exhibitions, talks & sessions, Marketplace & Talent for the funding and distribution of documentaries and development of filmmakers, unmissable live events, and its own awards.

Since beginning in 1994, DocFest has become the UK's biggest documentary festival and the third largest in the world. The BBC have called it "one of the leading showcases of documentary films".

Sheffield DocFest is now widely recognised as one of the top three documentary festivals in the world, and "the most significant documentary festival in Britain". The Festival has been voted one of the Top Five Coolest Documentary Film Festivals in the World by MovieMaker magazine.

About Sheffield DocFest

Sheffield DocFest is the UK's leading documentary festival and one of the world's most influential markets for documentary projects. The festival champions and presents the breadth of documentary form – film, television, immersive and art – in the vibrant city of Sheffield each June. DocFest offers makers and audiences a place for inspiration, debate, development, learning and challenge. DocFest's programming represents the festival's core values – creativity, empathy, freedom, inclusivity and internationalism.

Over the years, the festival has been held at over 20 other venues across Sheffield and the surrounding area, including the Showroom Workstation, Light Cinema, Sheffield Town Hall, Sheffield City Hall, and the DocFest Exchange on Tudor Square developed with Wellcome. Fun is a key element, and the festival holds many parties. The festival has grown steadily over recent years. DocFest screenings help many films to achieve a wider audience by attracting distribution and further screening opportunities for the films it shows.

Sheffield DocFest's Marketplace & Talent is a major part of the Festival, which includes the MeetMarket for films and series to achieve funding and distribution, Alternate Realities Market for interactive and virtual reality projects, live pitches, and other training initiatives.

Interactive, immersive and virtual reality documentary is also a central element of the Festival with interactive exhibitions and commissioned works scattered across the city, and the Alternate Realities Summit taking place throughout an entire day of the Festival.

Sheffield DocFest is the perfect platform for anyone with an interest in interactive, virtual reality and factual content. DocFest prides itself in supporting and nurturing new talent: in addition to the Festival days in June, Sheffield DocFest presents All Year workshops, screenings, labs and mentoring opportunities both in the UK and internationally.

{{Blockquote|text=Sheffield DocFest is renowned as a potent, innovative and fun festival that brings together works of great urgency and creativity. It is a privilege to have the opportunity to build on the legacy of past leadership and to work with the Board of Trustees and the dedicated Sheffield DocFest team at a time when the landscape for festivals, documentary makers and audiences is shifting so radically.|sign=Clare Stewart, Interim CEO|source=}}

History

In 1990, Peter Symes of BBC TV Features Bristol had the idea of creating a forum for British documentary filmmakers to debate and discuss their craft. In 1993, he set up a festival board which included representatives from Channel 4, United Artists, Discovery Channel, Central Independent Television and Granada Television. They chose to hold the festival in Sheffield, an English industrial town which was just beginning to develop a media and cultural sector.

The first Sheffield International Documentary Festival was held in 1994, formatted as an international film festival and conference for documentary professionals. It included a film programme, one or two masterclasses, and a party. It lasted two days and mainly attracted London-based filmmakers and producers, plus several international commissioners and distributors.

Over the next eight years, the Festival continued with around 475-700 delegates attending, and total audiences reaching around 2000. The Festival became an opportunity for London-based independent filmmakers to talk to commissioners at the BBC and Channel 4, who were otherwise difficult to reach. Success at the Festival might mean landing a job for the coming year.

In 2005 DocFest attracted more than 600 mostly-UK delegates and enjoyed almost 9000 screening and session admissions. However, with changes in the factual television marketplace, it was time for DocFest to move from a primarily craft-based event, and increase its marketplace activity. The chairman at the time, Steve Hewlett, visited the Australian International Documentary Conference (AIDC) where he met its director Heather Croall, who had a background in filmmaking and had founded the cross-platform storytelling event DigiDocs. He invited Croall to come and work for the festival, where she was subsequently Festival Director & CEO until early 2015, turning around the Festival's fortunes.

The 1990s rise in international co-productions meant that British producers could no longer rely solely on one big broadcaster for their entire budget, and instead had to look abroad to piece together financing for their films. To internationalise the Festival and help filmmakers achieve this financing, Croall introduced the MeetMarket pitching forum, where filmmakers pitch their ideas to funders in one-to-one meetings.  MeetMarket was developed with the help Karolina Lidin, Marketplace Executive Producer since 2008. In 2003, she developed the very first MeetMarket with Croall at AIDC, which was later brought to Sheffield in 2006.

Croall also introduced the digital-focused Summit and Crossover Market, now Alternate Realities Market, which – like the MeetMarket – pairs buyers and commissioners with game designers, technologists, producers, digital agencies and filmmakers, all looking to tell stories in the interactive realm.

In 2007, Hussain Currimbhoy joined as programmer.
 
In 2011 the Festival moved from November to June, to better fit into the industry calendar and ensure better weather and lighter evenings for visitors.

DocFest was an early advocate of crowdfunding as a source of finance for documentary filmmakers, and in 2010 staged its first festival-based crowdfunding pitching event, which was also an industry first.Jennifer Merin, Sheffield Doc Fest's Crowdfunding Initiative, about.com. Retrieved 10 October 2012 The campaign was launched on Indiegogo with a goal to raise $25k for the Festival to help stage special events. They exceeded their target.

From 2012, selected highlights from the Festival have often played at the BFI Southbank in London. The Festival began producing its own film projects, including From the Sea to the Land Beyond in 2012 and The Big Melt in 2013.

From 2014, the Festival became recognised by the Academy Awards as an Oscar-qualifying festival in the Best Documentary (Short Subject) category with the DocFest Short Doc Award Winner eligible to enter for consideration. Many DocFest Short Doc Award-winning films have gone on to be shortlisted for Oscars.

In 2014 DocFest presented films including Beyond Clueless and Love Is All at Latitude Festival, with Sigur Ros scored archive film The Show of Shows: 100 Years of Vaudeville, Circuses and Carnivals, Montage of Heck, Sounds of the Cosmos and a number of shorts also featured in 2015. This partnership has continued, and in 2017 DocFest brought a selection of virtual reality projects to Latitude for the first time, alongside a curated programme of shorts.

In 2014 there were some high level staff changes. Deputy Director Charlie Phillips left to head up the documentary arm of The Guardian, with director of Berwick Film & Media Arts Festival Melanie Iredale taking up the position. Director of Programming Hussain Currimbhoy left for Sundance Festival with former Executive Content Adviser at Independent Television Service (ITVS) Claire Aguilar becoming Head of Programming & Industry Engagement. Croall returned to Australia to direct the Adelaide Fringe.

Following Heather's departure, Crossover Labs Director Mark Atkin stepped in as acting director for the 2015 Festival, before Liz McIntyre of Discovery Networks joined as CEO & Festival Director from 1 September 2015.

Since McIntyre's appointment, the CEO & Festival Director has championed diverse and pluralist voices, inclusiveness and accessibility, for example creating a crèche service and introducing British Sign Language interpreted talks, Dementia-friendly screenings, Doc/Dinner for championing diverse talent within the industry, and a From Door to Doc, affording reduced rate entry to screenings for hard-to-reach areas of Sheffield.

In 2016 there were high-level staff appointments. Luke W Moody, formerly of BRITDOC (now Doc Society) joined as Director of Film Programming, replacing Head of Programming & Industry Engagement Claire Aguilar. Former Dogwoof Distribution Manager Patrick Hurley joined as Head of Marketplace & Talent, replacing Marketplace Manager Anna Parker. From BBC, Dan Tucker joined as Curator of Alternate Realities. And in 2017, Lisa Brook joined as Marketing & Events Consultant.

The effect of the Festival on Sheffield's economy is worth millions of pounds. Outside of the annual Festival, there is now also a year-round programme, called DocFest All Year, providing training, educational and cultural activities across the UK, including a training initiative for aspiring feature documentary producers called Future Producer School launched in 2014.

 2020 

The 27th Sheffield DocFest was due to take place between 4–9 June 2020. However, due to the COVID-19 pandemic, it was cancelled in its original form. In November 2019 Cíntia Gil became the new festival director at Sheffield DocFest. Her vision and film programme strands for the 27th edition of Sheffield DocFest were announced in "A letter to Sheffield and to those who will join DocFest in 2020".

 2019 

The 26th Sheffield DocFest was held between 6–11 June 2019, and attracted 28,098 public admissions, up 9% from the previous year, along with 3,489 industry delegates from 59 countries.

The Festival opened at Sheffield City Hall with a UK premiere of "Diego Maradona" by Asif Kapadia. The programme featured over 200 documentaries with 36 world premieres, 19 international, 12 European and 91 UK premieres. The films were chosen from a submission pool of 2548 from 52 countries around the world. Programme included "The Rest" by Ai Weiwei, "Nomad: In the Footsteps of Bruce Chatwin" by Werner Herzog, "Midnight Family" by Luke Lorentzen, "Earth" by Nikolaus Geyrhalter, "One Child Nation" by Nanfu Wang, "About Love" by Archana Atul Phadke, and "For Sama" by Waad Al-Kateab and Edward Watts.

Alternate Realities programme featured 28 projects and included "Subconscious Sensibilities" - an exhibition of virtual and augmented reality, games, interactive documentaries and large scale digital installations at Site Gallery. "Converging Sensibilities" at the Hallam Performance Lab  was a collection of 360° documentaries presented as a VR Cinema. VR experiences at the festival included: "Echo" by Georgie Pinn, "Le Lac" by Nyasha Kadandara, "Algorithmic Perfumery" by Frederik Duerinck, and "Spectre" by Bill Posters and dr. Daniel Howe – a Sheffield DocFest commission, in partnership with Site Gallery, British Council and MUTEK, with support from Arts Council England.

Over 200 speakers shared their own experiences at the 26th Sheffield DocFest. The Talks & Sessions programme included: Werner Herzog, Paul Greengrass, Jenn Nkiru, Asif Kapadia, Chidera Eggerue, Stacey Dooley, Rodney P, Michael Dapaah, Jeremy Deller and Paddy Wivell. Industry sessions programme included "My Big Break" featuring Roxy Rezvany, Ellie Flynn and Eliza Capai discussing their career highs and lows; and "Breaking the Class Ceiling" with Danny Leigh, Fiona Campbell, Kieran Yates, Billy Porter, Mia Bays and Paul Sng exploring barriers for entry to the industry.

Over 300 Decision Makers from over 30 countries attended the 2019 Festival, including executives from Netflix, Arte, BBC, Channel 4, Cinereach, Doc Society, Dogwoof, Altitude, Submarine Entertainment, ESPN, National Geographic, POV, RYOT, Artangel, Passion Pictures and Pulse Films. Over two days 87 teams took approximately 1,650 match-made meetings with the Decision Makers in the MeetMarket and Alternate Realities Talent Market.

 2018 
The 25th Edition of Sheffield DocFest was held between 7–12 June 2018.

 2017 
The 2017 event took place from 9 to 14 June. A record total of 72,146 audiences attended, including 3,397 industry delegates who travelled from 54 countries, 36,008 public audiences, and virtual audiences experiencing the Festival through livestream.

The film programme hosted a record 182 films with 35 world premieres, 21 international, 24 European and 73 UK premieres. The film programme boasted premieres including: Daisy Asquith's Queerama, the Opening Night Film, scored by John Grant; Laura Poitras' new Julian Assange documentary Risk; Whitney 'Can I Be Me' from Nick Broomfield; and Winnie from Pascale Lamche, which originated in DocFest's MeetMarket.

The Alternate Realities programme featured 26 projects, 12 of which had world premieres, 1 international, 5 European and 8 UK. VR experiences at the festival included: Chasing Coral: The VR Experience, presented in a 360 dome, which accompanied the feature documentary in the film programme; Unrest VR, which accompanied the feature film Unrest; and Future Aleppo by Alex Pearson and Marshmallow Laser Feast, a commission by DocFest, in partnership with FACT, and with support from Arts Council England.

The Talks & Sessions programme included big-name speakers Lenny Henry, Peter Greenaway, Ian Hislop, Stacey Dooley, Nick Broomfield and Louis Theroux. Industry sessions included: a panel about making your film Oscar-ready, featuring Tom Oyer from the Academy of Motion Picture Arts and Sciences; a sessions with God's Own Country director Francis Lee for the Northern Talent Talk; a free public interview with YouTube sensation Elijah Quashie aka The Chicken Connoisseur; and two sessions with editor Walter Murch.

2017 saw the reinvention of all film strands to concisely represent the creative vision of the Festival. The new strands featured in 2017 were: Doc/Vision, Doc/Adventure, Doc/Expose, Doc/Love, Doc/Think, Doc/Rhythm, Focus/Industry, featuring work-in-progress pieces, and Focus/India, featuring a collection of documentaries from that year's focus country of choice, to mark 70 years after Partition.

2017 also saw the use of new venue The Light Cinema on the Moor, offering 3 luxury cinema screens.

Following the 2017 Festival, 9 virtual reality works from the Alternate Realities exhibition were chosen to tour Latin America as part of DocFest's Realidades Alternativas tour with support from British Council. The tour visited festivals DocMontevideo in Uruguay, DocSP in Brazil, and Noviembre Electrónico in Argentina.

Notable screenings and events included:
 The world premiere Opening Night Film Queerama from director Daisy Asquith and with a soundtrack from John Grant, Alison Goldfrapp, and Hercules & Love Affair, chronicling 50 years after the decriminalization of homosexuality in the UK through the BFI archive. The Opening Night event included a Q&A with Asquith and Grant, hosted by Campbell X, and a performance from Grant
 Closing Night honoured MP Jo Cox with Closing Night Film Jo Cox: Death of an MP by director Toby Paxton, a discussion about her legacy, and a Great Get Together held on Tudor Square to encourage Festival-goers and the public to unite and remember
 A livestream of the UK Premiere of Nick Broomfield's Whitney 'Can I Be Me', featuring a Q&A with Broomfield and radio presenter Sarah-Jane Crawford, and a live tribute performance by Michele John, all broadcast live to 130 cinemas across the UK
 The return of Desert Island Docs, featuring Northern film star Maxine Peake as she discussed her favourite documentaries and the influence they hold on her life and work
 Joe Cocker: Mad Dog with Soul saw a sold-out screening in the iconic Leadmill, where Joe Cocker frequently performed
 The introduction of Docs 'til Dawn, showcasing rare cult documentaries after midnight. 2017's Docs 'til Dawn programme included Adam Curtis' HyperNormalisation, with an introduction from Curtis himself
 A retrospective looking back 50 years at 1967: The Summer of Love and Discontent, featuring films such as Allan King's Warrendale, Far from Vietnam produced by Chris Marker and directed by French New Wave filmmakers Jean-Luc Godard, Alain Resnais, Agnès Varda, Joris Ivens, William Klein and Claude Lelouch, and a rare screening of Edouard 'Yves' de Laurot's Silent Revolution/Black Liberation
 Immersive live cinema for the European premiere of Florian Habicht's Spookers, shown in the 1920s Abbeydale Picture House and featuring a fright-night cast of performers staged in the building
 The world premiere of Jamaican Dancehall competition film Bruk Out! from director Cori Wapnowski, including a follow-up dancehall dance class held by the film's protagonist Ale Camara at the DocFest Exchange on Tudor Square and the Channel 4 Party at Code featuring a performance from dancers featured in the film
 A work-in-progress special preview of 8 Minutes from the Alexander Whitley Dance Company, combining contemporary dance with NASA visuals from BAFTA-winning artist Tal Rosner, ahead of the Sadler Wells premiere in July
 The Alternate Realities Summit returned with a full day of panel sessions and keynote speakers, featuring Google's Jessica Brillhart, The Guardian's VR Deputy Editor Nicole Jackson, Amnesty International UK's Che Ramsden, and Robin McNicholas from Marshmallow Laser Feast on using the latest technology to create projects like Future Aleppo and including a surprise Skype from Future Aleppo's 13-year-old inspiration Syrian refugee Mohammed Kteish
 The European premiere of VR installation Munduruku: The Fight to Defend the Heart of the Amazon by Grace Boyle (The Feelies), James Manisty (Alchemy VR) and Pete Speller (Greenpeace), which went on to win the Alternate Realities Audience Award at DocFest 2017, and then further tour Latin America with DocFest's international VR tour 'Realidades Alternativas' with support from British Council
 Live VR experience DOOM ROOM hosted in Theatre Delicatessen mixed performance art with virtual reality in a UK premiere from Danish artist Mads Damsbo (source)
 The return of DocFest Exchange developed with Wellcome, offering elements of the film, Alternate Realities, and talks programmes for free to the public
 Years and Years frontman Olly Alexander on his new documentary Growing Up Gay and his personal struggle with mental health in the LGBTQ+ community
 Nick Broomfield in conversation with Louis Theroux for The BBC Interview, held at the sold-out Crucible Theatre
 The introduction of the Craft Summit presented by Documentary Campus, featuring industry heavyweights that dissect the art of documentary filmmaking. Speakers included editor Walter Murch, Field of Vision's Charlotte Cook and Ben Steele on serialised documentaries, Balz Bachmann and Nainita Desai on composing, and directors from the 2017 film programme Julia Dahr (Thank You for the Rain), Shaul Schwarz (Trophy) and Egil Håskjold Larsen (69 Minutes of 86 Days) on directing and cinematography

2016
The 2016 event took place from 10 to 15 June. A total of 32,769 audiences attended, including 3,534 industry delegates who travelled from 60 countries, and 29,235 public audiences, both figures a record increase on 2015.

The film programme hosted a record 160 films with 27 world premieres, 15 international, 19 European and a whopping 52 UK premieres from 49 different countries. Audiences were attracted to big filmmaking names from the documentary world including US director Michael Moore – whose film Where to Invade Next opened the Festival – Louis Theroux, Palme d'Or winning director Ken Loach, and legendary filmmakers D. A. Pennebaker and Chris Hegedus.

Women and LGBT+ subjects feature prominently throughout the Festival's selection, making up two of the festival's strands, plus a retrospective honouring Chantal Akerman. The speakers represented in the Talks & Sessions programme were 45% female.

The newly renamed Alternate Realities programme featured 14 immersive media experiences in Millennium Gallery, and 12 virtual reality documentaries in Site Gallery, The Space and Union Street. The Alternate Realities Summit was a day-long event with a focus on virtual reality, artificial intelligence, and mixed reality. The morning session saw a keynote from Ramona Pringle and Bina48, an artificially intelligent robot, while the afternoon session saw a keynote from Google's Jessica Brillhart. 2016 also saw the inaugural Alternate Realities Commission, supported by site Gallery and Arts Council England. Darren Emerson's Indefinite (previously Invisible) won the £5,000 prize and had its World Premiere at the Festival. Indefinite, about the detention of immigrants in Britain, was later featured by The New York Times.

2016 saw the introduction of the DocFest Exchange on Tudor Square developed with Wellcome, which hosted a series of public talks, including an interview with This is England director Shane Meadows.

Notable screening and events included:
 The UK Premiere of Michael Moore's Where to Invade Next opened the Festival at Sheffield City Hall, attended by Moore for a post-screening Q&A which was live streamed to more than 120 cinemas nationwide.
 The UK Premiere of The Seasons in Quincy: Four Portraits of John Berger closed the Festival with a sell-out screening at Showroom Cinema, attended by directors Tilda Swinton and Bartek Dziadosz
 Live performances accompanied film screenings including: a performance by protagonist and famous street dancer Storyboard P following the World Premiere of Storyboard P, a stranger in Sweden;  a solo set by Princess Shaw following the UK Premiere of Presenting Princess Shaw; and Where You're Meant to Be was screened in Abbeydale Picture House, followed by a set from Arab Strap's Aidan Moffat and the Bothy Ballad singers. 
 Following the UK Premieres of Strike a Pose and Kiki, the Vogue, Strike a Pose Party invited Madonna backup dancer Kevin Stea, New York ballroom leader Twiggy Pucci Garcon, and a house of voguers to O2 Academy
 USC Shoah Foundations' New Dimensions in Testimony had its World Premiere as part of the Alternate Realities Exhibition, showcasing groundbreaking technology in natural language processing software through a hologram of Holocaust Survivor Pinchas Gutter. The project was awarded both the Alternate Realities Interactive Award and Audience Award for Interactive Project. It was also featured in the Alternate Realities Summit, with creator Dr Stephen Smith presenting a keynote, joined by Gutter himself on stage
 Sir David Attenborough came to the Festival for the first time, seeing a sold-out talk at the Crucible Theatre, which was live broadcast to the Outdoor Screen on Tudor Square
 Ken Loach held a packed Q&A following Versus: The Life and Films of Ken Loach
 D. A. Pennebaker was honoured with a retrospective, and also attended the UK Premiere of his film Unlocking the Cage. The legendary documentary maker was also featured in conversation with collaborator Chris Hegedus at the Crucible Theatre
 Joanna Lumley delivered a packed talk at Crucible Theatre
 Snooker legend Ronnie O'Sullivan returned to the Crucible Theatre, where he has won five World Championship titles, to discuss his favourite documentaries

 2015 
The 22nd Festival ran for six days 5–10 June. Over 20 venues were used to host films, sessions, interactive exhibitions and networking events, with the full programme announced on the morning of the general election on 7 May. A record number of audiences attended the festival, with 3,422 festival delegates and 27,917 members of the public.

148 films were shown, of which a record breaking 31 were world premieres, including Sean McAllister's hotly anticipated A Syrian Love Story, Brian Hill's The Confessions of Thomas Quick, and Jake Witzenfeld's Oriented, 41 UK premieres, 13 international premieres, and 19 European premieres. Nearly 50% of the film programming was headed up by female filmmakers, with 73 of the films either produced or directed by women filmmakers.

Notable screenings and events included:
 The UK premiere of Joshua Oppenheimer's The Look of Silence at Showroom Cinema opened the Festival with sell out screenings in both Screens 3 and 4.
 Opening Night continued at Sheffield City Hall with the world premiere of archive film The Show of Shows: 100 Years of Vaudeville, Circuses and Carnivals directed by Benedikt Erlingsson and scored by Georg Hólm and Orri Páll Dýrason of Sigur Rós and the Head of the Pagan Church in Iceland and godfather of Icelandic music, Hilmar Örn Hilmarsson. The film features never before seen footage from fairgrounds, circuses, variety performances, vaudeville and more, from the very birth of film to the present day, including footage from The University of Sheffield's National Fairground Archive.
 A special screening of Jessica Edward's bio-doc Mavis! documenting the life of Mavis Staples was held in the classic Victorian Sheffield Botanical Gardens.
 Sheffield Repertory Orchestra performing Gustav Holst's The Planets live to a screening of interplanetary odysseys and commissioned visuals by Sheffield creative design agency Human and commentary from astronomer Paul Crowther.
 A 'Women in Docs' strand celebrating films with women on screen and behind the lens.
 War Work: 8 Songs with Film, a master work of poetic and musical archive composed and directed by Michael Nyman, and performed by Michael Nyman Band and Hilary Summers to commemorate the First World War.
 A retrospective of British activist filmmaker John Akomfrah.
 A closing night event including screening of Monty Python – The Meaning of Live by Roger Graef and James Rogan, with Michael Palin in attendance for a post-screening Q&A and book signing.
 The Ideas & Science strand, supported by the Wellcome Trust, focusing on creativity and innovation at the heart of documentary, digital and interactive.
 An 'Interactive at Sheffield' exhibition presented by Crossover Labs, featuring 16 interactive documentaries held at Millennium Gallery.
 A dedicated virtual reality arcade at Site Gallery featuring 9 projects on a collection of Oculus Rift, Samsung Gear VR and Google Cardboard.
 FINAL DAYS by British artist Heather Phillipson, a specially commissioned installation at Castle House, a defunct department store in the heard of Sheffield. Supported by Arts Council England, presented in partnership with University of Sheffield and Serpentine Galleries.

There were 83 sessions, talks and masterclasses, with speakers including Davina McCall, Nicky Campbell, Jon Snow, Lucy Worsley, Philippa Perry, Ian Katz, Charlotte Moore, and Robin Ince.

2014

The Festival expanded from five days to six and for the first time began on a Saturday. Screenings took place across a wider range of more unusual venues in Sheffield and the Peak District. 130 films were shown, of which 21 were world premieres, 24 UK premieres, and 12 European premieres.Eric Eidelstein, The 21st Annual Sheffield Documentary Festival Will Showcase a New Scorsese Film, Industry Sessions and More, indiewire.com, 8 May 2014. Retrieved 4 August 2014

World premieres included Martin Scorsese's documentary about The New York Review of Books, The 50 Year Argument; Alex Holmes' Stop At Nothing: The Lance Armstrong Story; The Last Man On The Moon, about former astronaut Eugene Cernan who also attended the Festival; One Rogue Reporter, written and directed by former 'Daily Star' reporter Rich Peppiatt; and Brilliant Creatures: Rebels of Oz.

Notable screenings and events included:
 The European premiere of Pulp: A Film About Life, Death and Supermarkets directed by Florian Habicht, telling the story of Pulp's final concert in Sheffield in 2012 and including a simulcast and live satellite Q&A with the band, broadcast to 120 cinemas across the UK and Ireland.Alicia Tan, Pulp head home for premiere of documentary at Sheffield Doc Fest, Radio Times, 2 June 2014. Retrieved 4 August 2014
 The premiere of Kim Longinotto's Love Is All at Chatsworth House with a soundtrack by Richard Hawley, combining film material from the BFI National Archive with original music in a similar vein to previous DocFest projects From the Sea to the Land Beyond and The Big Melt.
 Saint Etienne performing a live score to How We Used To Live, Paul Kelly's documentary about vanishing London.
 Summer Camp performing a live soundtrack to Guardian writer Charlie Lyne's film essay Beyond Clueless, about 90s teen movies.
 A 'Hell on Wheels' strand of cycling films to celebrate the Tour de France visiting Yorkshire.
 Nightly screenings in the Peak Cavern including Thomas Balmes' Happiness.
 A spotlight on South Africa including Miners Shot Down about the Marikana miners' strike.
 A retrospective of experimental Greek-French director Agnès Varda.
 An 'Interactive at Sheffield' exhibition presented by Crossover Labs, featuring 15 interactive documentaries delivered through devices including the Oculus Rift Virtual Reality headset. This included the first documentary videogames to be shown at the Festival, Riot and Papers, Please.
 Immersive documentary Door into the Dark.

Speakers included Peter Bazalgette, Jeremy Deller, Brian Eno, Sue Perkins, Grayson Perry, John Pilger, Jon Snow, and Ondi Timoner.

There were 82 conference sessions and masterclasses, and a record number of pitch opportunities for filmmakers worth £200,000.

2013

2013 saw a record number of films and delegates. Delegate numbers rose by 18% to 3,129. There were a record 18 international delegations including representatives from Armenia, Canada, Jordan, Morocco, the Netherlands, the State of Palestine, Russia, South Africa, and South Sudan, attending the Festival with a special focus on factual filmmaking in their regions.

250 buyers and Decision Makers from over 20 countries attended.

Film submissions topped 2000 for the first time. 120 films were shown, of which there were 77 feature length documentaries, 33 shorts, 10 interactive projects and one art installation. There were 18 world premieres, 12 UK premieres, and 5 European premieres. A record 14 films screening at DocFest were developed and funded through MeetMarket, including Joshua Oppenheimer's The Act of Killing which went on to win the Audience Award.

World premieres included Basically, Johnny Moped, Emptying The Skies, Everybody's Child, A Fragile Trust: Plagiarism, Power & Jayson Blair at the New York Times, Here Was Cuba, Mirage Men, Notes from the Inside with James Rhodes, Particle fever, Plot for Peace, Project Wild Thing, Richard Pryor: Omit the Logic, The Big Melt, Which Way is the Front Line from Here? The Life and Time of Tim Hetherington, The Man Whose Mind Exploded, The Road to Fame, The Secret Life of Uri Geller – Psychic Spy?, Thin Ice, and To Let The World In.

European premieres included After Tiller, Dirty Wars, and Pandora's Promise.

UK premieres included The Act of Killing and The Crash Reel. The Act of Killing went on to win a Bafta and was named best film of 2013 by The Guardian.

Film strands included Behind the Beats, Best of British, Cross-Platform, Euro/Doc, First Cut, Global Encounters, New York Times Op-Docs, Queer Screen, Resistance, Shorts, The Habit of Art, and This Sporting Life.

A new strand, Films on Film, screened a notable film with a documentary about it, for example The Exorcist (Director's Cut) with The Fear of God: 25 Years of The Exorcist, and John Waters' Female Trouble with I Am Divine. This strand aimed to attract a wider mix of people, and was supported by Lottery funding through the BFI's Film Festival Fund which provides extra resources to help grow film festival audiences.

The DocFest Retrospective strand celebrated the work of Japanese filmmaker Shōhei Imamura.

More than 75 directors were present and took part in Q&A sessions.

Notable screenings and events included:
 Three opening night films:
 The Big Melt, a documentary film about Sheffield's steel industry by Martin Wallace with a live soundtrack from Jarvis Cocker and over 50 musicians.
 An in-cave screening of The Summit, a climbing documentary by Nick Ryan about the quest to reach the peak of K2. This was screened at Peak Cavern, a cave known as the 'Devil's Arse', in the Peak District.
 The European premiere of Pussy Riot: A Punk Prayer followed by a Skype interview with Katya Samutsevich, one of the members of Pussy Riot.Mark Moran, Pussy Riot film to open Sheffield's DocFest 20, pictureville.net, 9 May 2013
 A live soundtrack performance of Songs from the Shipyards by Mercury Prize-nominees The Unthanks.
 A look behind-the-scenes of the BBC's Who Do You Think You Are? series.
 A day of events centred on the Ken Loach documentary The Spirit of '45.
 TEDxSheffield, a fringe event which took place the day before the Festival.
 The Howard Street outdoor screen which showed films for free for 12 hours each day during the Festival.<ref name="starhussain">Ellen Beardmore, Once in a lifetime' chance to see films', The Star (Sheffield), 30 May 2013</ref>
 Blast Theory's interactive online game I'd Hide You.
 Doc/Feast, a street food market made up of local foodie businesses, plus a special DocFest ale.

There were 80 conference sessions and masterclasses, and 300 speakers. Notable speakers included Adam Buxton, Melvyn Bragg, Jonathan Franzen, Uri Geller, Ira Glass, Alex Graham, Janice Hadlow, Jay Hunt, Ross Kemp, Mark Kermode, Sir Trevor McDonald, Hardeep Singh Kohli, Walter Murch, Miranda Sawyer interviewing Michael Palin, Sue Perkins, Captain Sensible, and Alan Yentob.

2012

2,657 delegates from 67 countries attended the Festival, and general admissions were 20,079.

Notable screenings and events included:
 The debut of From The Sea To The Land Beyond, a documentary by Penny Woolcock with a live soundtrack performance by British Sea Power.
 A surprise performance by Sixto Rodriguez, the star of opening night film Searching for Sugar Man, which went on to win an Oscar for Best Documentary.

Speakers included Gareth Malone and Tim Pool.

2011

2011 saw the Festival move from November to June, right off the back of the November 2010 Festival. The Festival opened with Morgan Spurlocks' POM Wonderful Presents: The Greatest Movie Ever Sold and featured box-office hit Senna, Alma Har'el's debut Bombay Beach, an Albert Maysels retrospective, and Oscar-winning director Barbara Kopple's Gun Fight.

Awards 

The Sheffield DocFest Awards honour the best documentaries from the DocFest programme, and are judged by industry professionals.

Current categories
 Sheffield DocFest Audience Award voted for by audiences, for both Films and Alternate Realities projects. 
 Grand Jury Prize for excellence in style, substance and approach. The jury is made up of UK and international documentary specialists. 
 Environmental Award given to the documentary that best addresses or raises awareness of the environmental challenges faces by the world.
 Interactive Award for a project that exhibits originality in approach to form, storytelling and delivery. The jury is made up of international film and interactive industry experts.
 Tim Hetherington Award presented by Dogwoof. This was introduced in 2013 to honour war photographer Tim Hetherington. It includes a cash prize and is decided by a jury including Tim's mother, Judith Hetherington.
 Illuminate Award supported by Wellcome. This award explores the screen chemistry between vibrant storytelling and innovative filmmaking inspired by science.
 Art Doc Award for new forms of documentary storytelling and bold, innovative non-fiction films.
 New Talent Award to discover the future of documentary film.
 Youth Jury Award for the film that is most engaging for young audiences. The winner is chosen by a jury of five young people aged 18–22, who take part in a series of workshops and screenings with industry professionals ahead of the festival.
 Short Doc Award, introduced in 2013, these films are made by new and established filmmakers from around the world and automatically qualifies the winner for consideration for the Academy Awards.
 Student Doc Award for films made as part of tertiary course work at UK and international universities, judged by a panel of industry experts.
 Alternate Realities Virtual Reality Award, celebrating virtual reality documentary as a flourishing creative genre awarding the project that displays excellence in factual storytelling as well as technical ingenuity.
 Alternate Realities Interactive Award, honouring the project that exhibits originality in its approach to form, storytelling and delivery.

Previous categories 
 Inspiration Award, introduced in 2009, which celebrates a figure in the industry who has championed documentary and helped get great work into the public eye.
 The In The Dark Sheffield International Audio Award introduced in 2014 to highlight the best in audio documentaries.
 Interactive Award
 Student Doc Award
 Sheffield Innovation Award   
 EDA Award for Best Female-Directed Film   
 The Wintonick Award
 Short Doc Audience Award   
 Creative Leadership Award   
 Award for Unsung Hero in Factual TV
 Storytelling and Innovation Award
 Jerwood First Cuts Award

Winners

2019

2018

2017

2016

2015 

The awards were held on 10 June 2015 at the Crucible Theatre.

2014 

The awards were held on 12 June 2014. For the first time, the award-winning documentary short automatically qualifies for consideration for the Academy Awards.

A Lifetime Achievement Award was presented to Roger Graef.

2013 

The awards were held on 16 June 2013, and presented by Jeremy Hardy.

The Alliance of Women Film Journalists also presented a Special EDA Award to Sheffield DocFest's Festival Director, Heather Croall, naming her 2013's Ambassador of Women's Films.

2012 
The awards were held on 17 June 2012.

2011

A Lifetime Achievement Award was presented to Albert Maysles.

2010

2009

Films 
Sheffield DocFest's film programme showcases international documentaries and new works of non-fiction.

The Film programme includes:
 Over 150 screenings of feature, mid-length and short documentaries and works of non-fiction each year.
 Q&As with the filmmakers and protagonists of the films.
 A strand of panels corresponding to the main programme, featuring filmmakers and protagonists of the films, including sessions, workshops, and pitching competitions.
 Free outdoor screenings of U-rated documentaries.
 A series of films In Competition for prestigious awards.

Alternate Realities 

Sheffield DocFest runs a number of programmes focused on new media development in interactive and immersive projects and virtual reality, titled Alternate Realities.

The Alternate Realities programme includes:

 The Alternative Realities Summit, which is a full day of sessions exploring the digital revolution in broadcasting. Delegates can network with representatives from the film and TV industry, which have included keynote speakers such as Google's Jessica Brillhart, BBC North's Richard Deverell, Frank Rose, Steven Johnson and Katerina Cizek from Highrise. The day includes breakout sessions and round table discussions.
 The Alternative Realities Market, which is a pitching event for interactive and digital projects run in a similar way to the festival's MeetMarket. It took place for the first time in 2013, when 27 project teams pitched to 85 cross-platform decision makers.
 A strand of Alternative Realities panels during the main Festival conference programme, which includes sessions, commissioning editor panels, workshops, project showcasing, and cross-platform pitching competitions.
 The Alternative Realities Exhibition, which shows and hosts interactive and VR including those commissioned especially for the Festival. This is also a space where delegates can meet and network.
 Meet the Maker sessions, which allow audiences to meet the artists behind the projects featured in the exhibition for informal Q&As.
In 2017, Alternate Realities at Sheffield DocFest was awarded Arts Council England NPO status, helping the programme to grow even further.

Talks & Sessions 
Sheffield DocFest's Talks & Sessions programme features high-profile speakers, industry creatives, and documentary talent in a variety of discussions, large public talks, commissioning question panels, interviews, and showcasing sessions.

Past high-profile speakers include Sir David Attenborough, Louis Theroux, Nick Broomfield, Stacey Dooley, Joanna Lumley, Reggie Yates, Walter Murch, Michael Moore, Kim Longinotto, Tilda Swinton, D. A. Pennebaker, John Akomfrah, Brett Morgan, Sue Perkins, and Joan Rivers.

Marketplace & Talent

MeetMarket & Alternate Realities Market 
MeetMarket & Alternate Realities Market is a documentary pitching event held at Sheffield DocFest, where filmmakers pitch their project ideas one-on-one to UK and international broadcasters, funders and distributors.

Former Festival Director Heather Croall introduced MeetMarket to DocFest in 2006 and developed it as an alternative to public pitching (where filmmakers pitch to a large audience). Each meeting is match-made and scheduled with relevant Decision Makers. Each year there are approximately 65 projects, which hold many one-to-one across two days. In 2017, the event was attended by 330 Decision Makers.

Since its introduction, nearly 10,800 meetings have taken place for 609 documentary and digital projects (as of July 2017).

All meetings held at MeetMarket have been requested by both parties, meaning it's more likely for a deal to be made. While the focus is on achieving funding and distribution, participants also benefit from advice on production, distribution, exhibition, marketing and outreach. Filmmaker Guy Davidi said "Pitching in intimate round-table sessions was a big comfort. It reduces tension and competitiveness and makes the whole thing much more relaxed and fun. We have created important connections and in one case it led directly to an investment."

In 2017, 63 projects from 22 countries, including new films from Michael Moore, Mark Cousins, Kim Longinotto, Dionne Walker, Laura Poitras, and Jerry Rothwell, and 24 Alternate Realities projects were selected, including works from Charlotte Mikkelborg, Richard Nockles, and INK Stories. 330 Decision Makers took part, including representatives from Submarine, BBC Earth VR, Royal Shakespeare Company, The National Film Board of Canada, VICE, and Pulse Films.

In 2016, 64 projects from 27 countries were chosen to participate, including new films from Orlando von Einsiedel, Jennifer Brea, Mike Lerner, Stefan Kloos, Nick Fraser, Christoph Jorg, David Letterman, Al Morrow, Jeanie Finlay, Andre Singer, Amir Amiriani, and Catherine Allen. 25 Alternate Realities Market projects were chosen, including works from Katharine Round, Alex Pearson, Darren Emerson, and Jennifer Brea. 313 Decision Makers took part in the MeetMarket, Alternate Realities Market and various other Marketplace initiatives from organisations including Red Bull, Canal+, Al Jazeera, Discovery, National Geographic, Google, and Netflix.

In 2015, 64 projects from 19 countries were chosen to participate in MeetMarket from 600 submissions, including new films from John Akomfrah, Lindsey Dryden and Maheen Zia. 300 executives, distributors, commissioners, funders, advisors and buyers across documentary and digital media took part in the MeetMarket and Marketplace activity including The Guardian, BBC, Arte, Dogwoof and Channel 4.

In 2014, 64 projects were chosen to participate in MeetMarket, including new films from Franny Armstrong, William Karel, and Stanley Nelson Jr. 290 investors, commissioners and production partners took part including commissioners from Netflix, Dazed, Vice, Vimeo and Nowness and distributors Oscilloscope Laboratories, Dogwoof and PBS.

In 2013 MeetMarket attracted over 600 applications. Over 60 projects from 18 countries were chosen to participate. Filmmakers included Franny Armstrong, Marshall Curry, Jeanie Finlay, Alex Gibney, Phil Grabsky, Brian Hill, Victor Kossakovsky and Joshua Oppenheimer. The selection also included six cross-platform projects.

MeetMarket films and Alternate Realities Market projects are tracked for success across awards and other film festivals. Films and projects have gone on to win awards at Sundance, Tribeca, IDFA, Hot Docs and DocFest.

Notable films to achieve funding through MeetMarket include Unrest and Unrest VR, Notes on Blindness and Notes on Blindness: Into Darkness, Joshua Oppenheimer's The Act of Killing and The Look of Silence, Searching for Sugarman, Jeanie Finlay's The Great Hip Hop Hoax, Ping Pong, 5 Broken Cameras, and God Loves Uganda.

Pitches 
The Marketplace plays host to further initiatives, such as pitches and prize competitions. Pitched projects are selected from an open call, cover a range of topics, and offer funding, in-kind support and Festival Pass prizes.

Previous pitches include:
 The BFI Film Fund
 The Whicker's World Foundation Film & TV Award, offering £80,000 to the winning pitch
 BBC Northern Docs Pitch
 The Guardian Pitch
 VICE Rule Britannia Pitch
 The Channel 4 First Cut Pitch
 Virgin Money Shorts Competition

Training Initiatives 
The Marketplace also holds All Year training initiatives, including Future Producer School. Future Producer School, created by Sheffield DocFest and Bungalow Town Productions, has successfully run every year since its launch in 2014. Aimed at emerging producers currently working in the industry, the primary outcome of Future Producer School is to develop industry partnerships and provide industry knowledge and experience to up-and-coming producers that have the ambition to become international feature documentary producers. Notable alumni include Eloise King, Julia Nottingham, Lindsey Dryden, and Sky Neal.

On-Screen Talent Market is a Sheffield DocFest initiative to connect charismatic subject-specialists with producers, commissioners, and other Decision Makers looking for fresh faces for their programmes. The programme includes an intensive morning training programme giving insight into the industry via first-hand encounters with established professionals, and is designed for the experts to hone their skills in presenting themselves to the media. This is followed by an afternoon of match-made one-to-one meetings between the talent and television executives. The programme is designed and delivered in collaboration with the Academic Ideas Lab.

Doc/Dinner allows a group of emerging filmmakers to dine with industry executives to exchange ideas and expertise, hosted by Yates. In 2017, execs from the BBC, Channel 4, VICE, Pulse Films and The Guardian met with 20 young filmmakers.

Delegations 
DocFest hosts a number of international and national delegations each year, including delegations from Norway, Scotland, Palestine, Indonesia, Jordan, Cuba and Wider Europe.

Social Events & Networking 
Each year, DocFest hosts parties and drinks events during the Festival and year-round, including the annual Guilty Pleasures Party held at both DocFest and in Amsterdam at IDFA.

Nightly parties are themed around the programme and in 2017 included: the I Will Always Love Docs Party, celebrating the premiere of Whitney "Can I Be Me"; a Great Get Together lunchtime picnic celebrating the life and legacy of Jo Cox MP, before the premiere of Closing Night Film Jo Cox: Death of an MP; and in 2016, and the Vogue, Strike a Pose Party, celebrating the premieres of Strike a Pose and Kiki.

Each year also sees the Award Ceremony hosted at Sheffield's Crucible Theatre, honouring the best films of the Festival. 
Each Festival sees dozens of networking drinks hosted by sponsors and supporters, including Image Nation Abu Dhabi, The Academy of Motion Picture Arts and Sciences, Shooting People, and more.

All Year programme 

DocFest activities outside of the five-day festival include:

 Films, for example DocFest presents which takes a selection of the Festival's film programme around the UK, and screenings at Latitude Festival.
 Alternate Realities Tours across the UK to various venues and Latitude Festival and internationally. In 2017, DocFest toured Latin America with the 'Realidades Alternativas' exhibition.
 Talks & Sessions across various film festivals, featuring members of the DocFest staff.  
 Marketplace & Talent, including ongoing mentoring programme for filmmakers.
 Networking events for filmmakers.   
 A structured internship and volunteer programme for young people.

Festival directors 
 Liz McIntyre, 2015–present
 Heather Croall, 2006–2014
 Brent Woods, 2002–2005
 Kathy Loizou, 1996–2001
 Paula Shirley, 1995
 Midge MacKenzie, 1994

Festival chairpersons 
Alex Cooke (producer) 2019–present (Deputy chair - Brian Woods 2016–present)
 Alex Graham, 2011–2019
 Steve Hewlett, 2005–2011
 Christo Hird, 2000–2004
 Roger James, 1997–2000
 Marian Bowan, 1996
 Peter Symes, 1994–1995

Board Members 
 Peter Armstrong
 Patrick Holland
 Ralph Lee
 Shirani Sabaratnam
 Helen Scott
 Ian Wild

References

External links
Official website
Crossover website (archived)

Annual events in the United Kingdom
Film festivals in England
Culture in Sheffield
Digital media organizations
Documentary film festivals in the United Kingdom
Documentary film organizations
Events in Sheffield
Festivals in South Yorkshire
Film organisations in the United Kingdom
Film festivals established in 1994
British documentary film awards